Thomas J. Hillery (June 16, 1904 – December 1, 1991) was an American politician who served in the New Jersey General Assembly from 1947 to 1954 and in the New Jersey Senate from 1954 to 1968.

He died of cardiac arrest on December 1, 1991, in Denville Township, New Jersey at age 87.

His father Thomas J. Hillery also served in the Assembly and the Senate.

References

1904 births
1991 deaths
Republican Party members of the New Jersey General Assembly
Republican Party New Jersey state senators
Majority leaders of the New Jersey Senate
Presidents of the New Jersey Senate
20th-century American politicians